McAuliffe or MacAuliffe is a surname of Norse Irish origin. The name is an Anglicisation of the Gaelic Mac Amhlaoibh, meaning "son of Amhlaoibh". The Gaelic name, Amhlaoibh, was derived from the Old Norse personal name Olaf. The surname occurs frequently in Munster, especially northern County Cork, western County  Limerick, and eastern County Kerry. The McAuliffes were a sept, related to the McCarthys.

People surnamed McAuliffe
General Anthony Clement "Nuts" McAuliffe (1898–1975), US general in the Battle of the Bulge
Callan McAuliffe, (born 1995), Australian actor
Christa McAuliffe (1948–1986), American teacher and astronaut (STS-51-L; perished during the Space Shuttle Challenger disaster) 
Dick McAuliffe (1939–2016), professional baseball player
Dorothy McAuliffe, American, First Lady of the Commonwealth of Virginia
Emmett McAuliffe, American lawyer and radio talk-show host
Gene McAuliffe (1872–1953), American professional baseball player
Jack McAuliffe (American football) (1901–1971), American football player
Jack McAuliffe (boxer) (1886–1937), Irish-born American boxer
Jack McAuliffe (brewer) (born 1945), American microbrewer
Jane Dammen McAuliffe, American, president of Bryn Mawr College
Leon McAuliffe (1917–1988), American guitarist and singer-songwriter
Maurice F. McAuliffe (1875–1944), American Roman Catholic bishop
Max Arthur Macauliffe, scholar of Sikh scripture
Nichola McAuliffe (born 1955), British actress
Paul McAuliffe, 350th Lord Mayor of Dublin
Roger McAuliffe, American politician
Ron McAuliffe (1918–1988), Australian politician
Rosemary McAuliffe, American politician
Steven J. McAuliffe (born 1948), American judge
Terry McAuliffe (born 1957), American businessman, political operative, and Governor of the Commonwealth of Virginia
Tim McAuliffe, Canadian television comedy writer
Timothy McAuliffe (1909-1985), Irish politician

See also 
Michael McAuliffe (disambiguation)
McCarthy (surname)
Mac Amhlaoibh and Mac Amhalghaidh (Irish septs)
Eóganachta

Notes 

Patronymic surnames
Anglicised Scottish Gaelic-language given names
Surnames of British Isles origin